Angel with a Lariat is the second album by k.d. lang and the Reclines, released in 1987. This was the first release outside of Canada.

Track listing
"Turn Me Round" (Ben Mink) – 3:13
"High Time for a Detour" (lang, Mink) – 4:09
"Diet of Strange Places" (lang) – 3:53
"Got the Bull by the Horns" (Amos Boyd, Billy Jones) – 3:03
"Watch Your Step Polka" (Teddy Borowiecki, lang, Dennis Marcenko, Gordie Matthews) – 2:01
"Rose Garden" (Joe South) – 3:19
"Tune into My Wave" (Mink) – 3:32
"Angel with a Lariat" (lang) – 3:08
"Pay Dirt" (lang) – 2:09
"Three Cigarettes in an Ashtray" (Eddie Miller, W. S. Stevenson) – 2:25

Personnel
k.d. lang – vocals, backing vocals

The Reclines
Teddy Borowiecki – accordion, keyboard, backing vocals
Dennis Marcenko – bass, backing vocals
Gordie Matthews – guitar, backing vocals
Ben Mink – guitar, electric mandolin, violin, backing vocals
Michel Pouliot – drums, backing vocals

Additional personnel
B.J. Cole – steel guitar on "Diet of Strange Places"
Roy Dodds – drums on "Three Cigarettes in an Ashtray"
Dave Edmunds – additional acoustic guitar on "Turn Into My Wave", backing vocals
Keith Nelson – banjo on "Turn Me Round" and "High Time For a Detour"
Anne Dudley - string arrangement on "Three Cigarettes in an Ashtray"

Production
Dave Edmunds - producer
Carey Taylor - engineer
Jeri McManus Heiden, Kim Champagne, k.d. lang - art direction
Amy Vangsgard - 3-D cover illustration

Chart performance

Certifications

References

K.d. lang albums
1987 albums
Sire Records albums
Albums produced by Dave Edmunds